Rexhep Qosja (born 1936) is an Albanian writer and literary critic from a part of Malësia in modern Montenegro (where locally the region is known as Malesija).

Life and career
He holds a bachelor's degree from the University of Pristina and graduated with a master's degree from the University of Belgrade Faculty of Philology in 1968. Qosja's brother Isa is a film director.

Qosja is the author of various anthologies and scholarly monographs, including a three-volume history of Albanian literature in the Romantic period. He is also the author of the novel Vdekja më vjen prej syve të tillë (Death Comes to Me from Such Eyes, Pristina, 1974).

Qosja has written books outlining the history of the Albanian people in the Balkans. Qosja was a figure in peace talks to end the Kosovo War of 1999. He has criticized many figures in Kosovo and Albania, including Ismail Kadare, Ibrahim Rugova, Sali Berisha, Fatos Nano, Nexhat Daci, Bajram Kosumi, and many Democratic League of Kosovo (LDK) party members. He also has criticized various people who have opposed the Kosovo Liberation Army, and those who did not fight for the recognition of Albanian minority rights.

References

External links 

 Regular members of ASHAK(Kosovo
 Rexhep Qasja "Shqip", Tirana
 interview given Blendi Fevziu Ismail Kadare in TV Klan
 R.Qoses interviews to Daily "Shqip", Tirana

1936 births
Living people
People from Plav, Montenegro
Kosovan writers
Albanian novelists
Albanian literary critics
University of Belgrade Faculty of Philology alumni
Kosovo Albanians
Yugoslav people of Albanian descent
Albanologists
Yugoslav writers
20th-century male writers
Yugoslav literary critics
Kosovan literary critics
Members of the Academy of Sciences and Arts of Kosovo